Earley Lake is a lake in Dakota County, in the U.S. state of Minnesota.

Earley Lake was named for William Earley, a pioneer who settled there in 1854.

See also
List of lakes in Minnesota

References

Lakes of Minnesota
Lakes of Dakota County, Minnesota